Samuel Oluwabukunmi Adeniran (born September 30, 1998) is an American professional soccer player who plays as a forward for St. Louis City SC in Major League Soccer.

Career
Adeniran started his professional career with Leganés B in Spain, with loan spells at fourth-tier side Guadalajara and Segunda División B side Castellón, without appearing for the latter. In 2019, he moved to German fifth-tier side Kickers Emden before a spell at fourth-tier club Atlas Delmenhorst. In early January, Adeniran requested his contract with the club be terminated to allow him to play in the United States. On March 15, 2021, Adeniran signed with USL Championship side Tacoma Defiance. He made his debut for Tacoma on May 16, 2021, appearing as a 75th-minute substitute during a 1–0 win over Orange County SC.

On December 14, 2021, Adeniran made the permanent move to the Seattle Sounders FC first team roster. He was loaned to USL Championship side San Antonio FC for the remainder of the season on June 9, 2022.

On December 15, 2022, Adeniran was traded to St. Louis City SC in exchange for $100,000 of General Allocation Money.

Personal life
Born in the United States, Adeniran is of Nigerian descent.

References

External links
Seattle Sounders FC bio

Living people
1998 births
People from Houston
Soccer players from Houston
American soccer players
American people of Nigerian descent
Association football forwards
Atlas Delmenhorst players
USL Championship players
Major League Soccer players
MLS Next Pro players
CD Castellón footballers
CD Guadalajara (Spain) footballers
CD Leganés B players
Kickers Emden players
Tacoma Defiance players
Seattle Sounders FC players
San Antonio FC players
American expatriate soccer players
American expatriate soccer players in Germany
American expatriate sportspeople in Portugal
Expatriate footballers in Portugal
American expatriate sportspeople in Spain
Expatriate footballers in Spain